The following is a list of churches in Dorchester, Dorset.

List 

 All Saints Church, Dorchester
 Christ Church, Dorchester
 Holy Trinity Church, Dorchester
St George's Church, Fordington
 St Mary's Church, Dorchester
 St Peter's Church, Dorchester

Dorchester, Dorset
Dorchester
Dorchester
Dorchester